Psegmatopterus politissimus is a species of beetle in the family Carabidae, the only species in the genus Psegmatopterus.

References

Pterostichinae